Power BI is an interactive data visualization software product developed by Microsoft with a primary focus on business intelligence. It is part of the Microsoft Power Platform.
Power BI is a collection of software services, apps, and connectors that work together to turn unrelated sources of data into coherent, visually immersive, and interactive insights. Data may be input by reading directly from a database, webpage, or structured files such as spreadsheets, CSV, XML, and JSON.

General
Power BI provides cloud-based BI (business intelligence) services, known as "Power BI Services", along with a desktop-based interface, called "Power BI Desktop". It offers data warehouse capabilities including data preparation, data discovery, and interactive dashboards.
In March 2016, Microsoft released an additional service called Power BI Embedded on its Azure cloud platform. One main differentiator of the product is the ability to load custom visualizations.

History
This application was originally conceived by Thierry D'Hers and Amir Netz of the SQL Server Reporting Services Team at Microsoft.  It was originally designed by Ron George in the summer of 2010 and named Project Crescent.  Project Crescent was initially available for public download on 11 July 2011, bundled with SQL Server Codename Denali.  Later renamed Power BI it was then unveiled by Microsoft in September 2013 as Power BI for Office 365.  The first release of Power BI was based on the Microsoft Excel-based add-ins: Power Query, Power Pivot and Power View. With time, Microsoft also added many additional features like Question and Answers, enterprise-level data connectivity, and security options via Power BI Gateways. Power BI was first released to the general public on 24 July 2015. It has several versions for Desktop, Web, and Mobile App, etc.  

On 14 April 2015, Microsoft announced that they had acquired the Canadian company Datazen, to "complement Power BI, our cloud-based business analytics service, rounding out our mobile capabilities for customers who need a mobile BI solution implemented on-premises and optimized for SQL Server."
  Most of the 'visuals' in Power BI started life as Datazen visuals.

In February 2019, Gartner.com, a software reviewing company, confirmed Microsoft as Leader in the "2019 Gartner Magic Quadrant for Analytics and Business Intelligence Platform" as a result of the capabilities of Power BI platform. This represented the 12th consecutive year of recognition of Microsoft as Leading vendor in this Magic Quadrant category (beginning 3 years before this tool was even created).

Key components
Key components of the Power BI ecosystem comprise: 
Power BI Desktop The Windows desktop-based application for PCs and desktops, primarily for designing and publishing reports to the Service.
Microsoft Power BI Desktop is built for the analyst. It combines state-of-the-art interactive visualizations, with industry-leading data query and modeling .
Power BI Service  The SaaS-based (software as a service) online service. This was formerly known as Power BI for Office 365, now referred to as PowerBI.com, or simply Power BI.
Power BI Mobile Apps  The Power BI Mobile apps for Android and iOS devices, as well as for Windows phones and tablets.
Power BI Gateway  Gateways are used to sync external data in and out of Power BI and are required for automated refreshes. In Enterprise mode, can also be used by Power Automate (previously called Flows) and PowerApps in Office 365.  
Power BI Embedded  Power BI REST API can be used to build dashboards and reports into the custom applications that serves Power BI users, as well as non-Power BI users.
Power BI Report Server  An on-premises Power BI is reporting solution for companies that won't or can't store data in the cloud-based Power BI Service.
Power BI Premium  Capacity-based offering that includes flexibility to publish reports broadly across an enterprise, without requiring recipients to be licensed individually per user. Greater scale and performance than shared capacity in the Power BI Service
Power BI Visuals Marketplace A marketplace of custom visuals and R-powered visuals. You can give life to your business data and take insight from this result. 
Power BI Dataflow A Power Query implementation in the cloud that can be used for data transformations to make a common Power BI Dataset that can be made available for several report developers through Microsoft's Common Data Service. It can be used as an alternative to for example doing transformations in SSAS, and may ensure that several report developers use data that has been transformed in a similar way.
Power BI Dataset A Power BI Dataset can work as a collection of data for use in Power BI reports, and can either be connected to or imported into a Power BI Report. A Dataset can be connected to and get its source data through one or more Dataflows.
Power BI Datamart Within Power BI, the Datamart is a container which combines Power BI Dataflows, Datasets and a type of data mart or data warehouse (in the form of an Azure SQL Database) into the same interface. The interface then has the possibility of being a single place for administration of both the ETL layer (Dataflow), an intermediary data mart (with for instance storage of star schemas, dimension tables, fact tables), and finally the modelling layer (Dataset).
Power BI Datahub A data hub for discovering Power BI datasets within an organization's Power BI Service so that datasets may be reused from one central location.It offers details on the things as well as an access point for working with them, such as building reports on top of them, utilizing them with Excel's Analyze feature, accessing settings, controlling permissions, and more.

Licenses 
Power BI has many different licenses depending on use.

User licenses 
Some common user licenses are Free, Pro and Premium. Free users must be part of an organisation with a Power BI license. They can consume reports, and can also build, but not publish. In practice, creators need at least a Pro in order to publish reports. Premium users can publish like Pro, but also have more features available for developing.

Workspace licenses 
Premium capacity refers to the license of the workspace, not the licenses of its users or creators. Also, access to several features, functionalities, and kinds of content that are exclusively accessible through Premium is made possible with a Power BI Premium per user license. Premium per user is a special workspace license which was added in 2020 November, and can be a more affordable alternative to Premium workspace licenses for organisations with few users which have advanced analytical requirements.

Paginated reports 

Paginated reports for Power BI, which can be built with Power BI Report Builder, are a special type of SSRS reports with pagination formatting which can give better control of the layout of reports which need to be printed to paper or pdf. This is in contrast to regular Power BI reports which instead are optimized for presentation or interactivity and exploration on a screen. Paginated reports can currently as of 2022 not be made with the regular Power BI Desktop report builder software. Instead, the standalone Power BI Report Builder has to be used, which can be viewed as a descendant of the SQL Server Reporting Services (SSRS) Microsoft Report Builder for Microsoft SQL Server introduced in 2004. It is also similar to the Report Designer in SQL Server Data Tools.

Power BI Paginated reports are saved in the Report Definition Language (.rdl file format), as opposed to the .pbix file of regular Power BI reports. The RDL format is based on XML, and was proposed by Microsoft as a benchmark for defining reports with SSRS

Some example use cases where currently as of 2022 paginated reports may be more suitable than regular Power BI reports may include printing of invoices or other repeated printouts of reports with similar layout but different content, or for printing reports where text would otherwise overflow due to being cut off by scrollbars.

See also
 Power Pivot
 Microsoft Excel
 SQL Server Reporting Services (SSRS)
 Power BI Report Builder, a variant of SSRS

References

Further reading

External links
 

Microsoft software
Business intelligence software
Data visualization software
Proprietary software